John Collier Fowler (17 November 1902 – 1979) was an English footballer who played as a full-back for Bradford City and Torquay United in the 1920s and 1930s.

References

1902 births
Footballers from Salford
1979 deaths
English footballers
Droylsden F.C. players
Bradford City A.F.C. players
Torquay United F.C. players
English Football League players
Association football fullbacks